Prelude No. 3 is a guitar piece written by Brazilian composer Heitor Villa-Lobos.

The piece is subtitled "Homenagem a Bach" (Homage to Bach), is in the key of A minor, marked "Andante", and is the third of the Five Preludes, written in 1940. The others are in E minor, E major, E minor, and D major. It was first performed, together with its four companions, by Abel Carlevaro in Montevideo on 11 December 1942.

The distinctive sound quality of this prelude relies on the open strings of the guitar. The connection to Johann Sebastian Bach is found principally in the second main section, with its patterns of descending melodic sequences and clear tonal harmonies.

References

Sources

Further reading
 Appleby, David P. 1988. Heitor Villa-Lobos: A Bio-Bibliography New York: Greenwood Press. .
 Santos, Turibio. 1985. Heitor Villa-Lobos and the Guitar, translated by Victoria Forde and Graham Wade. Gurtnacloona, Bantry, County Cork: Wise Owl Music. 
 Wright, Simon. 1992. Villa-Lobos. Oxford Studies of Composers. Oxford and New York: Oxford University Press.  (cloth);  (pbk).

External links

Compositions by Heitor Villa-Lobos
1940 compositions
Villa
Compositions in A minor